Eylül is a Turkish feminine given name meaning September.

It may refer to:

Eylül Aslan, Turkish photography artist
Eylül Cansın (1992-2015), transgender Turkish woman whose death by suicide prompted protests and calls for international LGBT equality in society
Eylül Elgalp (born 1991), Turkish footballer

Notes

Turkish feminine given names